Park or Castle of Park, is an A-listed rambling baronial mansion incorporating a 16th-century tower house.

History
The site was first built in 1292. In 1563 it was rebuilt as a Z-plan tower house, and it was extended in 1723, and in 1829 and later.
The building was owned by the Gordons.  Sir William Gordon, 3rd Baronet fought for the Jacobites during the Jacobite rising of 1745.  The property was forfeited, and the property was acquired by the Duffs.There are several Victorian additions, though the 12 Georgian windows are still clearly in evidence. Today, roughly 45 acres, the Park Burn (landform) and several 250 year old sycamore trees remain of what was once the vast estate of the baronetcy of Park.

Structure
The castle incorporated in the newer mansion is a Z-plan tower house, dating from the 1563 rebuilding. It is finished in harl, and features a medieval whetstone used as an interior arch.

See also

Castles in Great Britain and Ireland
List of castles in Scotland
Saint Amelia, Queen of Hungary

References

Castles in Aberdeenshire